Octavia Sperati, formerly known as Octavia, is a Norwegian gothic metal band from Bergen, Norway.

The group released their debut album Winter Enclosure in 2005. Their second album, Grace Submerged, was released in May 2007. Both albums were released by Candlelight Records, and both releases were followed by a tour in the United Kingdom. The band is currently all female except for the drummer, Ivar Alver.

On 20 July 2008, Octavia Sperati announced  that they would be "taking a break."

On 10 March 2009, it was announced that singer Silje Wergeland joined Dutch rock band The Gathering, replacing singer Anneke van Giersbergen.

On 21 February 2015, Wergeland announced Octavia Sperati's reunion via Twitter.

Discography 
 Guilty (demo) (2002)
 Winter Enclosure (2005)
 Grace Submerged (2007)

Members 
Current lineup
 Silje Wergeland – vocals 
 Bodil Myklebust – guitars 
 Gyri S. Losnegaard – guitars 
 Trine C. Johansen – bass guitar 
 Tone Midtgaard – synthesizer, keyboards 
 Ivar Alver – drums 

Former members
 Silje Røyseth – drums 
 Hege Larsen – drums 
 Christoffer Risbakk Vegsund – drums

References

External links
Band information
Octavia Sperati on MySpace
Silje Wergeland on MySpace

Musical groups established in 2000
2000 establishments in Norway
Norwegian gothic metal musical groups
Musical groups from Bergen
Candlelight Records artists